Phyllodesmium poindimiei (AKA: Spun Of Light) is an Alcyonacea feeding, aeolid nudibranch Gastropod belonging to the family Facelinidae. Cerata are important in this clade in terms of their physical defense and efficient metabolic processes. This species is spread sporadically along tropical coastal regions such as Australia, Hawaii, and the Indo-Pacific living in diverse marine habitats such as coral reefs. Unlike other species in the Opisthobranch Mollusca clade, P. poindimiei’s lush pink cerata are used for defensive purposes other than Nematocyst (dinoflagellate) capture and toxin release. Organismal ties within these thriving, tropical ecosystems can be determinants of environment change, which affects massive coral ecosystems. Continuously changing marine ecosystems, such as coral reefs, are directly linked to the evolution of organisms that live and thrive in the tropics such as the soft nudibrach P. poindimiei.

Evolution and description 

This monophyletic clade of mollusks were prosobranchs that eventually rid themselves of an exoskeleton. Elongated metazoans will lengthen themselves out to about 50 mm at longest. P. poindimiei typically has two pairs of tentacles with a built in olfactory system containing an eye at each base. The soft shell-less slug has cerata outgrowths on its upper side filled with the organism’s respiratory and digestive systems and can be cast off for protective purposes. These cylindrical gill cavities typically have two main defenses resulting from nematocyst or zooxanthellae obtainment. These translucent cerata for most Phyllodesmium contain cnidosacs at the tips in which nudibranchs digest nematocysts from Cnidarian prey, such as jellyfish or corals. P. poindimiei lack these cnidosacs that could be used for its own defense against the swimming crab Thalamita integer. Another modification this species lacks is the ability to accumulate zooxanthellae, microscopic photosynthetic dinoflagellates, in the branched digestive tract. The non-symbiotic species such as P. poindimiei were thought to have evolved earlier than the symbiotic clades.

Diet and growth
P. poindimiei live up to twelve months and develop from an egg to a free-swimming veliger larva. They feed on Telesto, Caridoa, and other Alcyonaceans with very small radula. Members of the Porifera phyla, sponges, act as epibiont on sediment or ectozoans on organisms, such as Octocorallia. Excess spongiform growth thereby prevents this Aeolid from consuming octocoral, a common prey for P. poindimiei which can become a problem for these picky eaters.

Ecology and conservation
Heterobranchs range from aquatic to terrestrial environments but P. poindimiei  specifically tends to surround itself with other multicellular organisms in tropical sessile environments such as diverse coral reefs. Many of the tropical locations where P. poindimiei reside are climate change research biotopes. Environment change is ideally studied using these animals because of their prompt life span and revival linkage to a diverse habitat sensitive to oceanic temperature change that could potentially cause coral bleaching. Most species of Phyllodesmium are found along the coastline of Australia, Hawaii, and the Indo-Pacific regions. Coastal channels and estuaries allow for ample shelter for these marine gastropod nudibranchs.

References

External links
 

Facelinidae
Gastropods described in 1928